The 2022 North Carolina Tar Heels men's soccer team represented the University of North Carolina at Chapel Hill during the 2022 NCAA Division I men's soccer season. It was the 76th season of the university fielding a program. The Tar Heels were led by twelfth year head coach Carlos Somoano and played their home games at Dorrance Field.

The Tar Heels finished the season 8–6–5 overall and 2–2–4 in ACC play to finish in fourth place in the Coastal Division. As the seventh overall seed in the ACC Tournament, they defeated Boston College in the First Round, before losing to eventual champions Syracuse in the Quarterfinals. They received an at-large bid to the NCAA Tournament.

Background

The Tar Heels finished the season 11–7–2 overall and 4–4–0 in ACC play to finish in fourth place in the Atlantic Division.  As the seventh overall seed in the ACC Tournament, they defeated Syracuse in the First Round, before losing to Clemson in the Quarterfinals.  They received an at-large bid to the NCAA Tournament.  As an unseeded team, they defeated Loyola (MD) via penalty shoot-out in the First Round before losing to sixth seeded New Hampshire in the Second Round.

Player movement

Departures

Incoming Transfers

Recruiting class

Squad

Roster

Team management 

Source:

Schedule

Source:

|-
!colspan=6 style=""| Exhibition

|-
!colspan=6 style=""| Regular season

|-
!colspan=6 style=""| ACC Tournament

|-
!colspan=6 style=""| NCAA Tournament

Awards and honors

2023 MLS Super Draft

Source:

Rankings

References 

2022
2022 Atlantic Coast Conference men's soccer season
American men's college soccer teams 2022 season
2022 in sports in North Carolina
2022 NCAA Division I Men's Soccer Tournament participants